(RZN) is a record label in the Avex Group that releases urban contemporary Japanese music.

History

The label was founded in 1999 by Max Matsuura with a focus on urban music, signing M-Flo as its first artist, then followed by Exile.

In 2000, Koda Kumi was signed by Rhythm Zone and debuted with the song "Take Back".

Artists and sublabels

Main
:
 2NE1 (Avex/Rhythm Zone/YGEX)
 Afra and the Incredible Beatbox Band
 Aili
 Aria
 Asako Toki
 Asia Engineer
 Baby M 
 Boyz II Men (Japan only)
 Bright
 Caravan
 The Chill
 Deep (formerly Color)
 Dorlis
 Dream
 DJ Emma
 Exile
 Atsushi (Atsushi Sato)
 Nesmith (Ryuta Karim Nesmith)
 FAKY
 Fukumimi
 Giant Swing
 Happiness
 Miyuki Hatakeyama
 Yuko Ishida
 Iconiq (Ito Ayumi)
 J Soul Brothers
 Jamosa
 Jonte
 Joey Boy
 Ken the 390
 Kumi Koda
 Seara Kojo
 Lisa
 M-Flo
 Ryu Yeong-gi (Verbal)
 Taku Takahashi
 Mai
 May J.
 Micron' Stuff
 Mini Box
 mink
 Miray
 Shion Miyawaki
 Nao
 Ohashi Trio
 Shinichi Osawa
 Quadraphonic
 Ryohei
 Misako Sakazume 
 Sowelu 
 Satomi Takasugi
 Riki Takeuchi
 Tenjochiki
 Tohoshinki
 Tomita Lab
 Twenty4-7
 Masaya Wada
 Warp-Generation
 yu-yu
 Zan
I Don't Like Mondays.

Fluctus
(Genre: rock)

 Unchain

Riddim Zone
(Genre: reggae. Founded in 2006 by Ryo the Skywalker.)

 Akane
 NG Head
 Natural Radio Station
 Rankin Taxi
 Rickie-G
 Ryo the Skywalker
 Tsuyoshi Kawakami and His Moodmakers (Justa/Riddim Zone)
 U-Dou and Platy

Former affiliates
  (2005–2006)
  (2001–2009)
 JYJ (2010–2013)

See also 
 Avex Trax
 J-pop
 List of record labels

References

External links
 Official site

Japanese record labels
Pop record labels
Record labels owned by Avex Group
Record labels established in 1999
1999 establishments in Japan